

List of World War II Kriegsmarine torpedoes

Kriegsmarine torpedo designation system
The first letter indicates the diameter:
 G = 53 cm (21 in)
 F = 45 cm (17.7 in)
 H = 60 cm (23.7 in)
 M = 75 cm (30 in)

The number indicates the approximate length (for example, the length of the TI is 7163 mm):
 7 = 7 m
 6 = 6 m
 5 = 5 m

Next letter(s) indicates specific features regarding propulsion and control:
 a = Atem, i.e. Pressluft/Dampfgemisch-Antrieb (pressurized air/steam - "wetheater" - engine)
 e = Elektrischer Antrieb (electric engine)
 f = Fernlenkung (remote control by radio or cable)
 d = Sauerstoff/Dampfgemisch-Antrieb (oxygen/steam engine)
 p = Primärbatterie-Antrieb (primary battery propulsion)
 m = Verbrennungsmaschine mit Kreislaufverfahren (combustion engine recirculating air)
 u = Sauerstoffträger Ingolin spurenfreier Antrieb (oxygen/steam engine with hydrogen peroxide as source for air, and no exposing "bubbletrack")
 x = Torpedo mit 3-Achsen Steuerung (3-axes control)
 r = Raketen- oder Düsenantrieb (rocket- or jet propulsion)
 s = Schall, Torpedo mit akustischen Suchkopf (acoustic seeker)
 t = Turbinenantrieb (turbine-engine)

"r" and "t" were only used with "u" to further denote the features of the ingolin-torpedoes.
Some sources claim that "s" only was used with "a" to denote the development of G7a with acoustic seeker-capability; however, it was no doubt used for the electric torpedoes with acoustic seekers (as "es" or just "s").

When the torpedo reached production status and was fielded (i.e. for operational use), Kriegsmarine gave it a short designation "T", or "Torpedonummer", with the number given in Roman lettering (TI, TII, TIII, TIV, etc.).
For different versions of the main torpedo, a small Arabic letter was added (for example TIIId, TVa etc.) denoting changes from the main design.

Warheads
Warheads were designated with the letter "K" (K = short for Kopf, meaning "head") and a small Arabic letter, with an additional number denoting variants of the head (for instance changing the material composition from bronze to steel, adding/removing spants during the course of the war or the method of installing the explosives). Examples: Ka, Ka1, Kb, Kb1, etc.

The explosive charge of warheads in German torpedoes during WW2, were different compositions of the Schießwolle (SW) that consisted mainly of a mixture of Trinitrotoluene (TNT) and Hexanitrodiphenylamin (HND):
 Schießwolle 18: 60% Trinitrotoluol, 24% Hexanitrodiphenylamin, 16% Aluminumpowder
 Schießwolle 36: 67% Trinitrotoluol, 8% Hexanitrodiphenylamin and 25% Aluminumpowder
 Schießwolle 39: 45% Trinitrotoluol, 5% Hexanitrodiphenylamin, 20% Aluminumpowder, 30% Ammonium Nitrate
 Schießwolle 39a: 50% Trinitrotoluol, 10% Hexanitrodiphenylamin, 35% Aluminumpowder, 5% Ammonium Nitrate
 Schießwolle xx (unknown): 0.6% Trinitrotoluol, 40% Aluminumpowder, 31.4% Ammonium Nitrate, 5.9% Sodium Nitrate, 2.3% Potassium Nitrate, 9.7% Cyclonite, 10.1% Ethylene Diamine Dinitrate

A total of 41 different types of explosive charges were used in German underwater ordnance, all given a "S"-number (1-41) for identification (only those relevant for torpedoes are listed here):
 S1 = SW 18 (solid consistency)
 S2 = SW 36 (solid consistency)
 S3 = SW 39 (solid consistency)
 S4 = Combination of S2 and S3 (solid consistency)
 S5 = Combination of S1 and S3 (solid consistency)
 S16 = SW xx (described as a "lumpy" consistency)
 S17 = SW 39a (solid consistency)
 S18 = Combination of S16 and S17 (easy liquefiable consistency)

List of Kriegsmarine warheads with weight/type of explosive charge:
 Type Ka: 295 kg/S2 (pre-WW2 head, not produced after ca 1941)
 Type Ka 1: 297 kg/S3 or S4 (in service from June 1942 to August 1943)
 Type Ka 2: 293 kg/S3, S4 or S18 (in service from August 1943)
 Type Kb: 282 kg/S2 or S18 (in service from September 1942)
 Type Kb 1: 282 kg/S18 (in service from February 1944)
 Type Kc: 260 kg/S2 (in service from March 1943)
 Type Kc 1: 256 kg/S2 or S18 (in service from October 1943)
 Type Kc 2: 256 kg/S18 (in service from May 1944)
 Type Ke: 274 kg/S2 (in service from July 1943)
 Type Ke 1: 274 kg/S2 or S18 (in service from February 1944)
 Type Kf: Unknown weight, but probably similar to the type Ke/S18 (in service from April 1944)

Pistols
Pistols used the "Pi" designations to begin with (Pi = short for pistole). The early models were named according to function and/or torpedo type like "PiG7H" or "PiG7A-MZ", but this was later replaced with a simple system of numbers, like "Pi1", "Pi2" etc.

To indicate variants within the main design, a small Latin letter was added after the number, like "Pi1a", "Pi1b" etc.

At some point, "Pi" was dropped for pistols with combination of mechanical (direct hit) and magnetic (influence) mechanisms, to the "TZ" designation (TZ = Torpedo-Zündeinrichtung). For example, the mechanical mechanism from the "Pi1" pistol combined with the magnetic mechanism from "Pi2" became the "TZ2".

The main booster charge used in German pistols was Pentrite, typically 300 g.

The following torpedopistols reached operational status with Kriegsmarine during WW2:
 Pi G7A-AZ: Mechanical igniter with short whiskers (replaced by Pi1)
 Pi G7A-MZ: Combined mechanical and (faulty) magnetic igniter (replaced by Pi2)
 Pi Typ 3F (later renamed Pi40): Copy of the British Type 3F pistol
 Pi G7H (later renamed Pi1): Mechanical igniter - most common pistol used besides Pi2
 Pi1a: Pi1 with netcutter
 Pi1b: Mechanical igniter with pendulum, rather than whiskers (not successful)
 Pi1c: Improved Pi1a
 Pi1d: Special version of the Pi1c for the TIIId "Dackel" torpedo (waterflap-safety replaced by a manually pulled safetypin, due to the torpedo's extremely low speed)
 Pi2: Mechanical igniter from Pi1 with an additional magnetic igniter
 Pi2a: Pi2 with netcutter
 Pi2c: Special variant of the Pi2a with its own battery for the low-speed TIIIb torpedo
 Pi2d: Improved variant of the Pi2c for torpedoes with low speed (TIIIb and TIIIc)
 Pi2e: Variant of the Pi2a with pendulum for the mechanical igniter, used for TIIIb and TIIIc torpedoes
 Pi2f: Variant of the Pi2d for low-speed TIIIb and TIIIc torpedoes
 Pi2 EDS: Pi2 with "endstreckendetonierersicherung" - a feature to ensure the torpedo did not detonate if missing the target
 TZ2: Combination of Pi1 and Pi2 used for torpedoes with low speeds below 30kn
 Pi3: Italian pistol - similar in function to the Pi2, but a different construction
 Pi3a: Variant of the Pi3, similar to the Pi1a
 Pi3c: Pi3 with netcutter
 PiSic (later renamed TZ3): Italian-constructed passive magnetic igniter combined with the mechanical igniter from the Pi3. Only used for G7a(TI) and G7a(TXIV)
 TZ3a: Improved German variant of the PiSic.
 TZ3b: TZ3a with improved induction-coil for the magnetic igniter
 Pi4: New pistol for heads with front-mounted acoustic seeker – i.e. the TIV, TV and TIX (mounted on top of the head with a pendoulum-based mechanical igniter and a separate active magnetic igniter)
 Pi4a: Pi4 with improved mechanical igniter
 Pi4b (also designated Pi DWK): New design of the mechanical igniter by Deutsche Werke Kiel (hence "DKW")
 Pi4c: Mechanical (pendolum) igniter (only used in the TZ5).
 Pi4c EDS (later renamed Pi4e): Pi4c with the EDS-function from the Pi2 EDS
 Pi4d SZE: Pi4c with "selbstzerstörungseinrichtung" - a function to ensure that the torpedo would detonate after missing a target, i.e. the opposite of EDS
 Pi5 (later renamed TZ5): Combination of Pi4c and a new active magnetic igniter (sender in head, receiver in tail)
 Pi6: New pistol ready for operational use with the TVI and TVII (ingolin) torpedoes. Based on the Pi3
 Pi6a: Pi6 improved with parts of the Pi1a
 TZ6: Mechanical igniter from the Pi6 and a new active magnetic igniter (sender in head, receiver in tail)

Code names
Code names were intended to be used only through the development period for security measures. However, in some cases they remained after the torpedo was fielded and had been designated with a "T"-number.

Torpedo pistols, program seeker-systems and other special arrangements also had their own "system" of code names, using the names of birds, fish or animals (for example Pi "Leuchtfisch", GA "Specht", seeker "Storch", control "Viper", target detector "Salamander" etc.). During development, the pistols were often given code names designated by the industrial developer or manufacturer.  Generally, these consisted of simple words, syllables, or names associated with the firm or the engineers in charge of the pistol's development (for example Pi "Otto", Pi "Atlas", Pi "Berlin" etc.).

Program steering
Program steering was accomplished by a mechanical device (Federapparat) coupled to the torpedo's gyroscope to alter its course in various pattern. Two main types was fielded during WW2: "Fat" and "Lut".
 
 Fat  Flächenabsuchender Torpedo (area searching torpedo), changed the torpedo's course over time so that it ran various patterns. Three versions: Fat I, II and III (Fat III was later redesignated Lut I).

 Lut  Lageunabhängiger Torpedo (bearing independent torpedo), changed the torpedo's course to a preset heading directly after launch, so the launching platform could fire torpedoes at targets without changing its own course. Two versions: Lut I and Lut II (+ a special Lut I variant for the TIIId torpedo with a very long initial straight run of 36000 m).

The Fat or Lut mechanisms initiated control of the gyroscope after an initial (preset) straight running distance.

Fat I ("S-shaped" loop-patterns):
The initial straight distance could be set from a minimum of 500 m to a maximum of 1500 m.
Two loop-patterns were available: "short" and "long", and in addition, there was a choice of right or left turns (i.e. a total of 5 settings on the Fat-mechanism).
For "short" loops, the straight distance between turns was 800 m, with a total width of the pattern-search of 1140 m
For "long" loops, the straight distance between turns was 1500 m, and a total width of the pattern-search of 1840 m.
The turning radius for both patterns was 170 m.

Fat II ("S-shaped loops or circular patterns):
The same as Fat I, but with an additional choice for "circular pattern", where the torpedo would run in a circle after the initial straight-run. This was an option primarily used by U-boats against attacking surface-ships that ran a zig-zag pattern hunting the U-boat (the goal was to locate the torpedo's circle-run just ahead of the attacking ship, hoping for a "lucky" hit).

Fat III / Lut I ("zig-zag" pattern):
Initial torpedo course could be chosen, so the torpedo platform did not need to change its bearing to an optimal course for torpedo launch.
The "Lut-speed" (i.e. the resulting advance-speed of the torpedo, considering the zig-zag pattern) could be chosen, and subsequently, the straight legs between turns would be adjusted accordingly.

Lut II:
Same as Lut I, but even slower Lut-speeds could be chosen.

List of World War II Luftwaffe torpedoes

Luftwaffe torpedo designation system
As a general rule, Luftwaffe followed the Kriegsmarine system of code names and designations, but with some differences.

Variations for the letter(s) indicating specific features regarding propulsion and control:
 b = Pressluft/Dampfgemisch-Antrieb (pressurized air/steam engine)
 i and w = Italian-built torpedoes by the firms Silvrificio Italiano S/A (Naples) and Whitehead (Fiume) respectively.

Instead of letters and numbers denoting dimensions and features, a single 3 or 4 digit number was used for some torpedo designs.

Luftwaffe used the "LT" designation (= Lufttorpedo), but not limited to operational torpedoes. It also combined further letters and numbers to indicate type and features of the torpedo:

 I = Pressluft/Dampfgemisch-Antrieb (pressurized air/steam engine)
 II = Ingolin-Antrieb (use of hydrogen-peroxide as oxygen carrier)
 A = Tiefen- und Winkeleinstellung von Hand (manual setting of depth and steering)
 B = Elektrische Tiefen- und Winkeleinstellung (electric setting of depth and steering, i.e. possible to change in flight)
 C = Programmsteuerung (program steering)
 1 = Speed of 40kn
 2 = Speed of 33kn
 3 = Speed of 24kn

Warheads
Luftwaffe warheads were designated GK (= Gefechtskopf) followed by a number and a small Arabic letter for variants. Exerciseheads was designated ÜK (= Übungskopf).
The various types of explosives are described under the section of Kriegsmarine warheads above.

Operational warheads (weight/type of explosive charge):
 GK 1: 200 kg/S3
 GK 2: 180 kg/S3
 GK 2a: 240 kg/S3
 GK 3: 188 kg/S17
 GK 3a: 250 kg/S17

Warheads in various state of development/test and production by end of the war (weight/type of explosive charge):
 GK 4: 230 kg/S18
 GK 4a: 220 kg/S18
 GK 5: 175 kg/S18
 GK 6: 180 kg/S3
 GK 9: 165 kg/S18
 GK 50: 300 kg/S18

Pistols
Designations for Luftwaffe pistols used the same system as Kriegsmarine.

The following torpedopistols reached operational status with Luftwaffe during WW2:
 Pi F5: Nose-mounted Luftwaffe adaption of the Kriegsmarine mechanical Pi G7A-AZ pistol (similar design with a reduced physical size)
 Pi 30: Pi F5 with connector for activation by an additional top-mounted magnetich mechanism
 Pi 42s: Nose-mounted mechanic mechanism in a Pi F5 housing without detonation-arms/whiskers. Used in combination with the Pi 50-series top-mounted magnetic pistols
 Pi 42s (e1): Pi 42s with electrical detonators, and an electric armingswitch controlled by the magnetic top-mounted Pi 52 magnetic pistol
 Pi 45: Pi 42s with an inertia (pendolum) mechanism and electric detonators. Used with (and activated by) the Pi 52 or Pi 65 top-mounted magnetic mechanisms.
 Pi 50: Italian top-mounted SIC combined mechanical/magnetic pistol. Used for LT IA and LT IB torpedoes. Similar design as the Kriegsmarine TZ 3.
 Pi 51: German produced magnetic version of the Italian SIC-pistol. Acted as a magnetic sensor and when activated, triggered the electric detonators in the nose-mounted mechanichal mechanism (Pi 30 or Pi 42s)
 Pi 52 (Pi Wien): Improved Pi 51 (ready, but never used before the war ended)
 Pi 52a: Improved Pi 52 for use in warheads with nose-mounted acoustic-seeker (ready, but never used before the war ended)
 Pi 52b: Adaption of the Pi 52 for use with Bombentorpedo (BT) (ready, but never used as the Bombentorpedoes never became operational)
 Pi 60: Active top-mounted magnetic mechanism, developed from the Kriegsmarine TZ 6. Used with the nose-mounted Pi 30
 Pi 65: Luftwaffe-adaption of the Kriegsmarine top-mounted TZ 5, for use with the "Pfau" and "Geier" torpedoes (active magnetic-mechanism) in combination with the nose-mounted Pi 45. Ready, but never used as the torpedoes were never fielded

Bombentorpedoes
Luftwaffe also developed a passive weapon called "Bombentorpedo" (BT), which was planned to replace the conventional torpedoes.
It was airdropped from a low height and relative short distance from the target, would enter the water and travel the short remaining distance solely driven by its kinetic energy. No BT's were ever fielded operationally.

German torpedo platforms (Torpedoträger)

Kriegsmarine
 Submarines (U-Boote)
 Motor torpedo boats (S-Boote - Schnellboote or E-Boats as designated by the Royal Navy)
 Larger surface vessels like battleships (Schlachtschiffe), cruisers (Kreuzer / Panzerschiffe), destroyers (Zerstörer), escorts/ corvettes/ frigates (Torpedoboote)
 Various types of "irregular" surface vessels, like auxiliary cruisers/raiders (Hilfskreuzer) and Q-ships.
 Fortified shore-based batteries (Torpedosperrbatterie)
 Various temporary torpedo batteries were established at strategic locations for a period of time - (for instance as a substitute until a more permanent battery was established, or as a temporary defence for an improvised naval base etc.).  These batteries varied from single to multiple tube launchers placed on quay/pier/suitable spot-on-the-ground or on small anchored boats/barges (schwimmende Batterie). An S-Boot anchored in fixed locations with its bow (and thus its torpedo tubes) facing one direction could also serve in this role. Typical armament for shore-based and temporary batteries were tubes from dismantled surface vessels (533mm Zwilling-, Drilling- or Vierling-Rohrsätze), Beutewaffe - i.e. tubes/torpedoes captured from the enemy, or older equipment from World War I.

Luftwaffe
Various aircraft designed for/configured as torpedo carriers:
 Heinkel He 59: Obsolete, only in service from 1937 to ca 1940 (capacity: 1 torpedo)
 Arado Ar 95 A: Limited number intended as a carrier-based torpedobomber, but was obsolete by 1940 (capacity: 1 torpedo)
 Arado Ar 195: Intended as a carrier-based torpedobomber, only a few prototypes used for testing in competition with the Fi 176, never used operationally (capacity: 1 torpedo)
 Fiesler Fi 167 A: Intended as a carrier-based torpedobomber, only a pre-production series built and tested towards the Ar 195 (capacity: 1 torpedo)
 Dornier Do 22: A few produced for export, never used by Luftwaffe (capacity: 1 torpedo)
 Blohm und Voss Bv 140: Only a few prototypes used for testing in competition with the He 115 (capacity: 1 torpedo)
 Heinkel He 115: Luftwaffe's first modern torpedobomber. In service from 1940 to 1942 (capacity: 1 torpedo)
 Junkers Ju 87 C: Experimental torpedobomber intended for carrier-operations. Never used operationally (capacity: 1 torpedo)
 Heinkel 111 J: Only a few built for torpedo trials in 1938, but ended up being used for reconnaissance (capacity: 2 torpedoes)
 Heinkel 111 H: The main standard German torpedobomber, in service from 1941 and throughout WW2 (capacity: 2 torpedoes)
 Junkers Ju 88 A: Standard German torpedobomber together with the He 111 H, in service from 1942 and throughout WW2 (capacity: 2 torpedoes)
 Junkers 188 E: Standard German torpedobomber introduced to service in 1944 (capacity: 2 torpedoes)
 Focke-Wulf Fw 200 C: Experimental torpedobomber, only used for one operation in 1941 (capacity: 2 or 4 torpedoes)
 Focke-Wulf Fw 190 A: Experimental torpedobomber tested in 1943. Never used operationally (capacity: 1 torpedo)
 Focke-Wulf Fw 190 F: Experimental torpedobomber tested in 1943. Never used operationally (capacity: 1 torpedo)
 Heinkel 177 A-5: Experimental torpedobomber. Never used operationally (capacity: 2 or 4 torpedoes)
 Heinkel 177 R-6: Experimental torpedobomber. Never used operationally (capacity: 2 or 4 torpedoes)
 Messerschmitt Me 410 B: Experimental torpedobomber tested in 1944. Never used operationally (capacity: 1 torpedo)
 Dornier Do 217 E: Planned/experimental torpedobomber intended for use with new torpedodesigns in development with advanced controls. Never used operationally (capacity: 2 or 4 torpedoes)
 Dornier Do 217 K: Planned/experimental torpedobomber intended for use with new torpedodesigns in development with advanced controls. Never used operationally (capacity: 2 or 4 torpedoes)
 Dornier Do 217 M: Planned/experimental torpedobomber intended for use with new torpedodesigns in development with advanced controls. Never used operationally (capacity: 2 or 4 torpedoes)
 Fokker T-8 W: Dutch torpedobomber. Beutewaffe never used operationally as torpedobomber by Luftwaffe (capacity: 1 torpedo)

References

 Bundesmarine: Deutsche Unterwasserwaffen - Torpedos, 1967 (German translation of U.S. Navy Ordnance Pamphlet 1673B)
 Bundesmarine: Torpedo Zünder der Deutschen Marine von 1914 bis 1968 mit historischen Rückblick Band 1, ca 1975
 Torpedo Versuch Anstalt Eckernförde (TVA/E): Short survey of the course of Torpedo Development from T1 to the newest types, 1946 (post-war report for the Royal Navy)
 Royal Navy: B.R.1972 German torpedoes and development of German torpedo control, 1952
 Combined Intelligence Objectives Subcommittee: Evaluation Report 167: Details of Contents of Microfilm on Captured Documents Pertaining to German Torpedo Developments, 1945
 Wehrmacht/Kriegsmarine: Technische Dienstvorschrift Nr. 194 Torpedo-Kopf-Pistolen-Tabelle, 1944
 Wehrmacht/Kriegsmarine: Various torpedo handbooks and regulations (Marine-Dienstvorschriften)
 Wehrmacht/Luftwaffe: Various torpedo handbooks and regulations (Luftwaffen-Dienstvorschriften)
 U.S. Navy Ordnance Pamphlet 1666 German Explosive Ordnance Volume 1, 1946
 Eberhard Rössler: Die Torpedos der deutschen U-Boote (2.ed), 2005
 Friedrich Lauck: Der Lufttorpedo - Entwicklung und Technik in Deutschland 1915-1945, 1981
 Harold Thiele: Luftwaffe Aerial Torpedo Aircraft and Operations in World War Two, 2004
 Fritz Hahn: Deutsche Geheimwaffen 1939-1945 - Flugzeugbewaffnungen, 1963
 David H Wright: Thesis on German torpedo crisis in WW2, 2004
 Numerous allied reports and captured German documents from Kriegsmarine and Luftwaffe, kept at various archival-institutions and museums. Primary sources: The US National Archives/NARA (mainly Record Group 38 and Record Group 242/publication T-1022), the British National Archives/TNA (mainly Royal Navy Admiralty record-groups 213, 290 and 292), the German National Archives/Ba, the Norwegian National Archives/RA and the Norwegian Naval Museum/MMU.